This is a list of Danish football transfers for the 2021 summer transfer window. Only moves featuring at least one Danish Superliga club are listed.

The winter transfer window opened on 15 June 2021. The window closed at midnight on 31 August 2021.

Danish Superliga

AaB

In:

Out:

AGF

In:

Out:

Brøndby

In:

Out:

Copenhagen

In:

Out:

Midtjylland

In:

Out:

Nordsjælland

In:

Out:

OB

In:

Out:

Randers

In:

Out:

Silkeborg

In:

Out:

SønderjyskE

In:

Out:

Vejle

In:

Out:

Viborg FF

In:

Out:

References

Denmark
Transfers
2021–22